Pehr Adolf Qværnstrøm (February 8, 1878 – December 12, 1949) was a Norwegian actor, film director, and scriptwriter.

Filmography

As an actor
1911: Bondefangeri i Vaterland as the farmer
1911: Fattigdommens forbandelse
1912: Hemmeligheden as the fisherman
1920: Kaksen på Øverland as Aasmund Venaas, a musician
1937: Bra mennesker as a merchant
1938: Det drønner gjennom dalen as a forest owner
1938: Lenkene brytes as Ludvigsen
1938: Ungen as a restaurateur
1939: Familien på Borgan as Ola Bråten
1939: Gryr i Norden as the chairman
1940: Godvakker-Maren as the merchant Nils Endresen
1943: Vigdis as a court witness
1946: Så møtes vi imorgen as the office manager

As director
1911: Bondefangeri i Vaterland

As scriptwriter
1911: Bondefangeri i Vaterland

References

External links
 

1878 births
1949 deaths
Norwegian male film actors
Norwegian male silent film actors
Norwegian film directors
20th-century Norwegian male actors
People from Halden